Chalermkiat Sombutpan (born June 20, 1985) is a Thai professional footballer who plays as a goalkeeper for Thai League 1 club Police Tero.

References

External links

Living people
1985 births
Chalermkiat Sombutpan
Chalermkiat Sombutpan
Association football goalkeepers
Chalermkiat Sombutpan
Chalermkiat Sombutpan